Dean Evan Hart, O.D., M.A., M.S. (Candidate in Bioethics), B.S., A.A.S., F.A.A.O. (born November 4, 1957) is an American scientist, clinical optometrist, professor, and the founder of Woodbury Ophthalmic Group and Woodbury Optical Studio. Dean ran for Nassau County Legislature in 2015. He was a candidate for the New York State Assembly in the 15th Assembly District of the 2016 election. Hart also ran for town office in 2017.

Early life and education
Dean Evan Hart was born November 4, 1957 in Jericho, New York. He graduated with a bachelor's degree from New York Institute of Technology and earned an M.A. in biology from Hofstra University. Hart holds an O.D. from SUNY College of Optometry and conducted postgraduate research at the University of California, Berkeley. He completed an M.S. degree in bioethics at Columbia University in May 2021.

Career

Medical and science - Treatment of the visually impaired
Dean Hart held a position in academia starting with Director of the Low Vision Clinic to teach Ophthalmology residents to treat and manage the visually impaired at Harlem Hospital Medical Center. He instructed and mentored the art of Refraction and Physical Optics within the Department of Ophthalmology, Columbia University, The Edward S. Harkness Eye Institute.

Hart was an Associate Research Scientist at the College of Physicians and Surgeons, Department of Ophthalmology, Harkness Eye Institute from 1989 to 1998. He was appointed assistant professor in ophthalmology at Columbia University directing contact lens and low vision clinics from 1998 to 2012.

Hart concurrently founded Woodbury Ophthalmic Group and Woodbury Optical Studio in 1989 in Hicksville, NY and practiced optometry there ever since. He is licensed by the American Board of Opticianry. While founding his own practice, Dean widely publishes and lectures to the three O's – opticians, optometrists and ophthalmologists. He has been a reviewer of many different peer review scientific journal articles prior to publication. Dean is often interviewed by various TV and radio networks on clinically applicable issues. Dr. Hart attended press conferences in New York City and Long Island, NY about protecting people's eyes when viewing the solar eclipse of August 21, 2017 featured in newspapers and on television.

As a scientist, Hart mastered and applied different techniques to laboratory and clinical research endeavors. He also conducts lectures, presentations, and writes for publications to scientists in many fields on research topics including immunocytohistochemistry, polymer chemistry, biochemistry, electron microscopy, dietary and environments effects on tears, clinical epidemiology, microbiology, elemental analysis, physiological optics, bioethics, and contact lenses.

Political activity
In 2015, Hart ran for Nassau County Legislature on the Democratic line against an incumbent Republican in the 18th Legislative District and lost by one-percent. Hart founded Long Island Citizens for Good Government (LICGG) and became its president. As President of the group he called on Nassau County District Attorney to investigate Town of Oyster Bay contracts. He also supports oversight of Oyster Bay finances. In spring of 2016, Dean launched his campaign for the New York State Assembly. Hart has been a candidate for town, county, and state offices, running on Democrat, Working Family, Women's Equality, Independence, Green, and Reform party lines. There is a recurring theme of anti-corruption and government reform which emphasizes greater checks and balances with his runs for office and activism. He is also a constitutionalist and libertarian by bioethical philosophy.

Humanitarian work
Hart joined Moreano World Medical Mission on a trip to the Dominican Republic to fit eyeglasses for impoverished children and seniors without cost to patients. Dr. Hart donated most of the tools needed to carry out the mission. He went with the help of Woodbury Optical. The trip was praised by New York State Assemblyman Chuck Lavine.

Hart spoke at the United Nations about advancing women's healthcare globally after his trip to the Dominican Republic. He noted the disproportionate impact of lacking adequate healthcare on women and their eyes.

As President of Long Island Citizens for Good Government, Hart called for ending a contract with Florida-based Armor Correctional Health Services and entering a contract with Nassau University Medical Center in East Meadow to keep tax dollars in state and provide faster medical attention due to the hospital being “across the street” from the jail. As well as mistreatment of prisoners, another concern was billing fraud, which is already under investigation by the State Attorney General. The medical center needed improvement that now is implemented.

Hart donated many years to work with the visually impaired in New York's inner city, Harlem. In 2016 he volunteered time for ophthalmic care at the special Olympics in Brockport, NY. Dr. Hart is currently the Ophthalmic Affairs Chairman of Friends for Good Health, an international not-for-profit 501(c)(3) organization that works to provide healthcare for people in poverty around the world.

Awards and recognition
 Long Island Business News- 2016  Top CEO Awards
 Long Island Business news- 2016 Achievements in Healthcare
 American Optometric Association's, Contact Lens Section awarded its inaugural legend award in 2012.
 American Optometric Association, Contact Lens Section awarded its yearly achievement award in 1999. 
 The Joint Commission of Allied Health Professionals in Ophthalmology issued the faculty recognition in 1999
 The American Optometric Foundation - Harold Kohn memorial award for outstanding paper based on original investigative research work in 1987.
 Sola/Barnes-Hind - scholarship to study microbial associations and perform scanning electron microscopy to examine the varied interactions with soft lenses as a postgraduate researcher, the University of California at Berkeley in 1985.
 Sola/Barnes-Hind - collaborative study concerning potassium levels in the tear fluid of, and nutrition to, lipid depositors in 1985.
 The National Eye Institute - travel fellowship for the presentation of research findings, 1985 ARVO meeting
 Sola/Barnes-Hind - scanning electron microscopy at the American Museum of Natural History in 1984.
 Optometric Center of New York in 1984.
 Scuba diving photographic awards
 Front and back covers of diver alert network photographs as well as NJ macro photo award.

See also
 Ophthalmology
 Optometry
 New York State Assembly

References

External links
 
 
 
 
 
 

Living people
1957 births
American optometrists
American scientists